The Bootleg Series Volumes 1–3 is a box set by Bob Dylan issued on Columbia Records. It is the first installment in Dylan's Bootleg Series, comprising material spanning the first three decades of his career, from 1961 to 1989.

Background
Dylan has been subject to bootleg recordings throughout his career; the first bootleg of the rock era, Great White Wonder, consisted of pirate recordings drawn from various sources. His 1985 box set Biograph, rather than just being another (very large) compilation, presented 18 never officially released tracks of 53 total, acknowledging this long-standing appetite for pirated Dylan recordings. With the approach of Dylan's 30-year mark in the record industry, Columbia Records initiated the proper release of material that had circulated regularly on Dylan bootlegs, starting with this box set in 1991 to satisfy demand for Dylan's unissued material.

Content
The Bootleg Series Volumes 1–3 contains rarities and unreleased works from the sessions for 1962's eponymous debut Bob Dylan to 1989's Oh Mercy; at the time of its issue a survey of his entire recording career. Of the 58 total tracks, 45 are session outtakes from recording sessions for Dylan studio albums. Of the remaining 13 tracks, one is an outtake from the session for the "George Jackson" single of 1971, two are further releases from the Basement Tape sessions of 1967, five are live recordings, and five are demo records, three of latter being later duplicated on Volume 9 of the series. With the appearance of further volumes, other recordings from this set have also been duplicated, such as those on Volume 11 or Volume 12.

The material is spread across three compact discs, five vinyl records, or three cassette tapes. In the case of the compact disc and cassette versions, each individual disc or cassette is labeled in the set as a distinct volume. Subsequent albums in the Bootleg Series were standardized to a double-disc volume in their primary non-limited edition format, excepting for Volumes 14 and 15, and all continue the compact disc volume numbering. Unlike ensuing installments in the series, none of Volumes 1–3 are available individually in physical form. Also unlike subsequent volumes in the series, only this one constitutes a complete overview of Dylan's career, at least as measured by the date of its release.

A remastered version in smaller packaging was issued on August 19, 1997, on Legacy Recordings, the reissue imprint of Sony Records.

Reception
In his 2006 Bob Dylan Encyclopedia, author Michael Gray states that "most artists couldn't muster a single outtake to hold alongside any of this; Dylan can provide 58 recordings almost every one of which is of numinous excellence." The success of this set generated an entire series of official Dylan bootlegs issued under the Legacy Records imprint of Sony Music, with an additional 14 installments as of 2023.

Other artists have also followed suit in presenting archived concerts and studio material, specifically the following: The Beatles with their anthology sets from the mid-1990s; The Grateful Dead with their multiple continued vault release series; Neil Young and his archives series; The Rolling Stones with their official bootlegs; and Miles Davis with his bootleg series also on Legacy Records.

Track listing
All songs written by Bob Dylan, except where noted; all arrangements by Bob Dylan.

Personnel

 Bob Dylan — vocals, guitars, harmonica, piano
 Barry Beckett – keyboards (disc 3, track 5)
 Roy Bittan — keyboards (disc 3, track 15)
 Mike Bloomfield — electric guitar (disc 2, tracks 8–10)
 Russell Bridges — bass guitar (disc 2, track 16)
 Harvey Brooks — bass guitar (disc 2, tracks 8–10)
 Charlie Brown, III — guitar (disc 2, track 19; disc 3, track 1; possibly disc 2, track 18)
 Tony Brown —  bass guitar (disc 2, tracks 18–20)
 Gary Burke — conga drum (disc 3, track 4)
 T Bone Burnett — guitar (disc 3, track 4)
 Kenny Buttrey — drums (disc 2, track 16)
 Buddy Cage — pedal steel guitar
 Alan Clark — keyboards (disc 3, tracks 10–12), organ (disc 3, track 13)
 Roddy Colonna — drums (disc 3, track 16)
 Richard Crooks — drums (disc 2, track 19)
 Charlie Daniels — bass guitar (disc 2, track 15)
 Rick Danko — bass guitar (disc 2, tracks 11–14, 17), backing vocals (disc 2, track 13)
 Carolyn Dennis — backing vocals (possibly disc 3, tracks 8 & 9)
 Rick DiFonzi — guitar (disc 3, track 16)
 Tim Drummond — bass guitar (disc 3, tracks 5 & 7, possibly 8 & 9)
 Sly Dunbar— drums (disc 3, tracks 10–13, 15)
 Erik Frandsen — slide guitar (disc 3, track 3)
 Glen Fukunaga — bass guitar (disc 3, track 16)
 Full Force — backing vocals (disc 3, track 11)
 Al Gorgoni — guitar (disc 2, track 7)
 Bobby Gregg — drums (disc 2, tracks 7, 8, 10 & 11)
 Paul Griffin — keyboards (disc 2, tracks 7, 8, & 10)
 Emmylou Harris — backing vocals (disc 3, track 2)
 George Harrison — guitar (disc 2, track 15)
 Regina Havis — backing vocals (possibly disc 3, tracks 8 & 9)
 Levon Helm — drums (disc 2, tracks 13, 14, & 17), backing vocals (disc 2, track 13)
 Garth Hudson — organ (disc 2, tracks 12–14, 17)
 Ben Keith — pedal steel guitar (disc 2, track 16)
 Jim Keltner —  drums (disc 3, track 7, possibly tracks 8 & 9)

 Clydie King — backing vocals  (disc 3, track 7, possibly tracks 8 & 9)
 Mark Knopfler — guitar (disc 3, tracks 5, 10–14)
 Sandy Konikoff — drums (disc 2, track 12)
 Al Kooper — organ (disc 2, tracks 8–11)
 Barry Kornfeld — guitar (disc 2, track 19; disc 3, track 1; possibly disc 2, track 18)
 Danny "Kootch" Kortchmar — guitar (disc 3, track 7)
 Russ Kunkel — drums (disc 2, track 15)
 Daniel Lanois — guitar, 12-string guitar, bass guitar, percussion (disc 3, track 16)
 Joseph Macho Jr. — bass guitar (disc 2, track 7)
 David Mansfield — mandolin (disc 3, track 4)
 Richard Manuel — piano (disc 2, tracks 12–14, 17), backing vocals (disc 2, track 13)
 Tom McFaul — keyboards (disc 2, track 19)
 Bob Neuwirth — guitar (disc 3, track 4)
 Cyril Neville — talking drum (disc 3, track 16)
 Kenny Rankin — guitar (disc 2, track 7)
 Steve Ripley — guitar (disc 3, track 7)
 Scarlet Rivera — violin (disc 3, tracks 2 & 4)
 Robbie Robertson — guitar (disc 2, tracks 11–14, 17)
 Mick Ronson — guitar (disc 3, track 4)
 Mason Ruffner — guitar (disc 3, track 16)
 Robbie Shakespeare — bass guitar (disc 3, tracks 10–13, 15)
 Steven Soles — guitar (disc 3, track 4)
 Rob Stoner — bass guitar (disc 3, tracks 2–4)
 Sugar Blue — harmonica (disc 3, track 3)
 Fred Tackett — guitar (disc 3, track
 Mick Taylor — guitar (disc 3, tracks 10–13)
 Benmont Tench — organ (disc 3, track 7, possibly tracks 8 & 9)
 Steven Van Zandt — guitar (disc 3, track 15)
 Jennifer Warnes — backing vocals (disc 3, track 6)
 Eric Weissberg — guitar (disc 2, track 19; disc 3, track 1; possibly disc 2, track 18)
 Pick Withers — drums (disc 3, track 5)
 Peter Wood — keyboards (disc 3, track 16)
 Howie Wyeth — drums (disc 3, track 2 & 4)

Technical personnel
 Jeff Rosen — production and compilation
 Vic Anesini, Bob Irwin — digital remastering
 Josh Abbey, Jim Ball, Tim Geelan — mixing
 Steven Berkowitz — production coordination, marketing
 Christopher Austopchuk, Nicky Lindeman — art direction
 Don Hunstein, Morgan Renard — photography
 John Bauldie — liner notes

References

External links
Information about The Bootleg Series

1991 compilation albums
Bob Dylan compilation albums
Columbia Records compilation albums